Chicualacuala District (Portuguese: Distrito de Chicualacuala) is a district of Gaza Province in south-western Mozambique. The population density of Chicualacuala District 2.1 residents per square kilometers, significantly lower than the average of 17.5 in Gaza Province.

The district seat is the town of Chicualacuala.

Chicuacuala District is bordered to the north by the Massangena District, to the east by Chigubo District, to the southwest by Mabalane District, to the south by Massingir District, to the southwest by South Africa, and to the northwest by Zimbabwe. It is home to several villages along the Limpopo River including Dumela, Mbuzi, Kunguma, Mawene, Xicumba, Xicumbane, Ngala, Panhame, Mabuzane, and Xitshutswini.

Chicuacuala District has four health centers; the single hospital in the province is located outside the district. The district also lacks a bank.

Geography
The whole district belongs to the drainage basin of the Limpopo, and the Limpopo River flows through the district. Other big rivers in the district are the Nuanetzi River, the Chefu River, the Munene River, and the Singuédzi River. The latter makes the border with Massingir District.

Banhine National Park, part of Great Limpopo Transfrontier Park, is shared between Chigubo, Chicualacuala, and Mabalane Districts. Limpopo National Park, also part of Great Limpopo Transfrontier Park, is shared between Massingir, Chicualacuala, and Mabalane Districts.

Demographics
As of 2005, 47% of the population of the district was younger than 15 years. 25% of the population spoke Portuguese. The most common mothertongue among the population was Tsonga. 69% were analphabetic, mostly women.

Administrative divisions

The district is divided into three postos, Chicualacuala (three localities), Mapai (four localities),  and Pafuri (two localities).
 Chicualacuala: 
 Vila Eduardo Mondlane
 Chicualacuala B
 Litlatlha
 Mahatlane
 Mapai: 
 Chidulo
 16 de Junho
 M'Ponze
 Mapai-Rio
 Pafuri: 
 Mbuzi
 Mungumbane

Economy

Agriculture
The main agricultural products are corn, cassava, cowpea, peanut, and sweet potato. Population of cattle, pigs, sheep, and goats was steadily growing prior to 2005.

Transportation
The Limpopo Railroad (Southern System) runs through the district.

References

 
Districts in Gaza Province